Preneet Kaur (born 3 October 1944) is an Indian politician who served in the Government of India as a Minister of State in the Ministry of External Affairs from 2009 to 2014. She is married to Amarinder Singh, who was the 15th Chief Minister of Punjab. She joined the Congress party, to which her husband also belonged once, and contested parliamentary elections repeatedly from the Patiala constituency. In February 2023, she was suspended from party for supporting BJP leader and her husband Amarinder Singh. She won the elections of 1999, 2004 and 2009, but lost her seat in the elections of 2014 and made a comeback by winning again in 2019.

Background and personal life
Praneet Kaur was born in Shimla, India into a Kahlon Jat Sikh family. She is the daughter of Sardar Gian Singh Kahlon, an officer in the Indian Civil Service, and Satinder Kaur. Gian Singh Kahlon entered the Indian Civil Service in 1937, when it was extremely rare for an Indian to be granted entry into that elite administrative service. He served in many senior positions, including as Chief Secretary of Punjab in the 1960s. He died in December 2002. Preneet Kaur has one brother, Himmat Singh Kahlon, who works for the UNO, and one sister, Geetinder Kaur, who is married to the politician and former IPS officer Simranjit Singh Mann. Praneet Kaur attended St. Bede's College, Shimla and graduated from The Convent of Jesus and Mary, Shimla.

In October 1964, Praneet Kaur was married to Capt. Amarinder Singh in a match arranged by parents in the usual Indian tradition. Her husband was the son and heir of the titular Maharaja of Patiala, formerly the ruler of the largest princely state in Punjab. Amarinder Singh, who was serving as an officer in the Indian Army at the time of the wedding, succeeded his father as titular Maharaja of Patiala in 1974, whereupon Praneet Kaur became the Maharani of Patiala. After resigning from the army, Amarinder Singh followed in the footsteps of his father and entered politics, where he met with great success. He was elected to parliament from the Patiala constituency in 1980, and to the Punjab state legislative assembly in 1985, 1992 and 2002, serving as minister in the state government for many years. In 2002, he took office as Chief Minister of Punjab for the first time and served a full five-year term until 2007. In March 2017, he again led the Congress party to victory in the state assembly elections and took office again as Chief Minister of Punjab for the second time, and held the position until 18 September 2021.

Praneet Kaur and Amarinder Singh are the parents of two children, a son Raninder Singh (born 1967) and one daughter Jai Inder Kaur (born 1966). Raninder Singh is a politician who has contested elections both to parliament and to the state legislative assembly. He is married to Rishma Kaur, daughter of a businessman, Kuldip Singh Dhingra, owner of Berger Paints India Limited, and his wife Meeta Dhingra. Raninder and Rishma are the parents of three children, a son, Yaduinder Singh (born April 2003) and two daughters namely Seherinder Kaur (b.1996) and Inayatinder Kaur (b.1999). Yaduinder, who is the youngest of Praneet's five grandchildren, is in line to become the titular Maharaja of Patiala in due course.

Praneet's daughter Jai Inder Kaur is married to Sardar Gurpal Singh Sandhu. Incidentally, Gurpal Singh's sister Ishwarpreet Kaur is married to Praneet Kaur's brother, Himmat Singh Kahlon. Gurpal Singh and Jai Inder Kaur are the parents of two sons, Angad and Nirvaan. In March 2015, Angad Singh Sandhu married Aparajita Kumari (they have a daughter, Rudrangini Kaur), princess of Bashahr, youngest daughter of Raja Virbhadra Singh of Bashahr, an active politician with the Congress Party and four-time Chief Minister of Himachal Pradesh (1983–90, 1993–98, 2003–07, 2012–17). In March 2017, just days before Amarinder Singh took office for the second time as Chief Minister of Punjab, Jai Inder's second son, Nirvaan Singh Sandhu, married Mriganka Singh Jamwal, princess of Kashmir, daughter of crown prince Vikramaditya Singh of Kashmir and his wife, Chitrangada Raje. Mriganka's paternal grandfather is Dr. Karan Singh, Maharaja of Jammu and Kashmir, again a politician belonging to the Congress party, while her maternal grandfather was Madhavrao Scindia, Maharaja of Gwalior and again a successful politician belonging to the Congress party. Mriganka's maternal uncle (Chitrangada Raje's brother) is the Congress politician Jyotiraditya Scindia, titular Maharaja of Gwalior. Her grandaunt is Vasundhara Raje, who is presently (since 2003) serving her second term as Chief Minister of Rajasthan. Praneet's family are this deeply embedded in Indian political circles, and especially of the Congress party.

Political career
Prior to entering politics, Preneet was instrumental in founding Sanjeevani, an institution in Patiala for differently abled children. She started her political career by contesting the General elections of 1999 from the Patiala Lok Sabha constituency. Patiala was the capital of the princely state formerly ruled by her husband's family.

She won her seat in 1999, but her party lost the election and sat in opposition. After the next general elections (2004), her party formed the government and Preneet also retained her seat. She remained a back-bencher in Parliament, living mostly in Chandigarh where her husband was at this time Chief Minister of Punjab. During these two terms in the Lok Sabha, Preneet served in various committees, such as those on Food, Civil Supplies and Public Distribution; Women's Empowerment; Public Undertakings; and Water Resources. She also served on the Consultative Committees attached to the Ministry of Agriculture and the Ministry of Petroleum and Natural Gas.

In 2007, Amarinder demitted office after his party lost the elections to the state assembly. In 2009, after she won the Patiala seat for the third successive term in the elections of 2009, and during the UPA-II government, Praneet was made a Minister of State (MoS) in the Ministry of External Affairs. She was one of two Ministers of State who served under the Cabinet Minister for External Affairs.

In the general elections of 2014, Preneet lost the Patiala Lok Sabha seat to Dharamvir Gandhi of the Aam Aadmi Party by a margin of 20,942 votes. Preneet's party was routed at the parliamentary polls and demitted office.

She was one of the 42 INC MLAs who submitted their resignation in protest of a decision of the Supreme Court of India ruling Punjab's termination of the Sutlej-Yamuna Link (SYL) water canal unconstitutional.

Controversy
In 2014, the BJP-ruled Union Government submitted to the Supreme Court of India a list of names of people who held Swiss bank accounts. The names were submitted in a sealed cover and not revealed to the public. However, the fact that a former union minister featured in the list became known and was reported by the press. One day before the list was submitted to the court, Preneet issued a statement saying that she had held a Swiss bank account for many years, and that this fact was known to the authorities. The statement also said that in 2011, Preneet had given clarifications to the finance ministry regarding this matter.

References

External links

1944 births
Living people
People from Shimla
People from Patiala
Indian National Congress politicians from Himachal Pradesh
India MPs 1999–2004
India MPs 2004–2009
India MPs 2009–2014
Indian Sikhs
Punjabi people
Lok Sabha members from Punjab, India
Women in Punjab, India politics
Women in Himachal Pradesh politics
21st-century Indian women politicians
21st-century Indian politicians
20th-century Indian women politicians
20th-century Indian politicians
Indian National Congress politicians from Punjab, India
Women union ministers of state of India
India MPs 2019–present